Fels is a surname. Notable people with the surname include:

Allan Fels AO (born 1942), Australian economist, lawyer and public servant
Anthony Fels (born 1964), former Australian politician
Edmond de Fels (1858–1951), French diplomat, writer and historian, built the castle "Château de Voisins" in 1903-06 by Rene Sergent
Florent Fels (1891–1977), French journalist, publisher and author
Joseph Fels (1853–1914), American soap manufacturer, millionaire, and philanthropist
Ken Fels (born 1978), Canadian retired professional ice hockey defenceman
Laurent Fels, writer and high school teacher in Luxembourg
Mary Fels (1863–1953), German-born, American philanthropist, suffragist, Georgist; wife of Joseph Fels
Samuel Simeon Fels (1860–1950), American businessman and philanthropist
Willi Fels CMG (1858–1946), New Zealand merchant, collector and philanthropist

See also
Joseph Fels Barnes (1907–1970), American journalist
Adler Fels, California winery based in Sonoma
Der Fels, group of German Expressionist artists around 1920 to 1927
Der fließende Fels, German television series
Hohle Fels, cave in the Swabian Jura of Germany with Upper Paleolithic finds
Fels-Naptha, American brand of bar laundry soap
Fels Formation, geologic formation in Austria
Fels Institute of Government, University of Pennsylvania
Fels am Wagram, municipality in the district of Tulln in Lower Austria

References